Eucalyptus barberi, commonly known as Barber's gum, is a tree or mallee that is endemic to Tasmania. It has mostly smooth, greyish bark, elliptic to lance-shaped or curved adult leaves, diamond-shaped or club-shaped buds in groups of seven in leaf axils, white flowers and cup-shaped, cylindrical or conical fruit.

Description
It has smooth bark, sometimes with loose slabs of rough bark near the base. The smooth bark is greyish, brownish or yellowish, often with ribbons of shed bark in the upper branches. Flowering occurs between August and December and the flowers are white.

Taxonomy and naming
Eucalyptus barberi was first formally described in 1972 by Lawrie Johnson and Donald Blaxell from a specimen collected near Cranbrook. The specific epithet (barberi) honours Horace Barber.

Distribution and habitat
Barber's gum grows in dry forest on the edges of dolerite outcrops and on low hills and sloping ground in eastern Tasmania. It is conserved in the Douglas Apsley National Park.

See also
List of Eucalyptus species

References

Trees of Australia
barberi
Myrtales of Australia
Flora of Tasmania
Plants described in 1972
Taxa named by Lawrence Alexander Sidney Johnson